My Shit may refer to:

 "My Shit" (Scribe song), a 2007 single by Scribe.
 "My Shit" (A Boogie wit da Hoodie song), a 2016 single by A Boogie wit da Hoodie.
 "My Shit", a 2012 single by Johnny Polygon.